Francisco T. Matugas, also known as Lalo Matugas, is a Filipino politician from the first district of the province of Surigao del Norte, Philippines. He served as Governor of the province from 2019 to 2022. He was first elected as Governor in 1992, and served for 9 years. He also previously served as the congressman of the province's first district.

His son Francisco Jose "Bingo" F. Matugas II is currently the incumbent Representative (Congressman) of Surigao del Norte's first legislative district while his wife Sol F. Matugas is a former governor of the same province. His sister and relative Elizabeth "Abeth" T. Matugas and Francisco "Junjun" M. Gonzales are the incumbent Mayor and Vice Mayor of Dapa, Surigao del Norte respectively. His younger brother Ernesto "Nitoy" T. Matugas and nephew Ernesto "Estong" U. Matugas Jr. were former Vice Mayor and Mayor of Surigao City respectively.

Matugas is also a former president of Siargao Island Institute of Technology whom his wife Sol is now the current president.

References

External links
Province of Surigao del Norte Official Website

Living people
1969 births
PDP–Laban politicians
Members of the House of Representatives of the Philippines from Surigao del Norte
Governors of Surigao del Norte